Tain is a town and royal burgh in the Highland council area of Scotland.

Tain may also refer to:

Places
 Tain, Shekhawati, a village in Rajasthan, India
 Tain, the Romansch name of Davos Wiesen, a village in Switzerland
 Tain A.K, a union council between Thorar and Pachiot, Pakistan
 Tain Burghs (UK Parliament constituency), the historic district of Burghs constituency in Scotland
 Tain District, Ghana
 Tain River, Ghana
 Tain-l'Hermitage, a commune in the Drôme department, France
 Táin Way, a long-distance trail in County Louth, Ireland
 Tain railway station, Tain, Scotland

Culture
 Any of the lesser táins of ancient Irish literature
The Táin Bó Cúailnge, or "Cattle Raid of Cooley"
 The Tain (Decemberists album), 2004
 The Táin (Horslips album), 1973
 The Tain (novella), a 2002 novella by British author China Miéville
 Jeff "Tain" Watts (born 1960), American jazz drummer
 Enabran Tain, a Cardassian character on Star Trek: Deep Space Nine

See also
 Taine (disambiguation)
 Tane (disambiguation)
 Tein (disambiguation)